Montenegro competed at the 2019 World Aquatics Championships in Gwangju, South Korea from 12 to 28 July.

Swimming

Montenegro entered three swimmers.

Men

Women

Water polo

Men's tournament

Team roster

Dejan Lazović
Draško Brguljan (C)
Đuro Radović
Marko Petković
Uroš Čučković
Aleksa Ukropina
Mlađan Janović
Bogdan Đurđić
Aleksandar Ivović
Vladan Spaić
Dragan Drašković
Nikola Murišić
Slaven Kandić
Coach: Vladimir Gojković

Group A

Playoffs

9th–12th place semifinals

Ninth place game

References

Nations at the 2019 World Aquatics Championships
Montenegro at the World Aquatics Championships
2019 in Montenegrin sport